The General Medical Council (GMC) is a public body that maintains the official register of medical practitioners within the United Kingdom. Its chief responsibility is to "protect, promote and maintain the health and safety of the public" by controlling entry to the register, and suspending or removing members when necessary. It also sets the standards for medical schools in the UK. Membership of the register confers substantial privileges under Part VI of the Medical Act 1983. It is a criminal offence to make a false claim of membership. The GMC is supported by fees paid by its members, and it became a registered charity in 2001.

History

The Medical Act 1858 established the General Council of Medical Education and Registration of the United Kingdom as a statutory body. Initially its members were elected by the members of the profession, and enjoyed widespread confidence from the profession.

Purpose
All the GMC's functions derive from a statutory requirement for the establishment and maintenance of a register, which is the definitive list of doctors as provisionally or fully "registered medical practitioners", within the public sector in Britain. The GMC controls entry to the List of Registered Medical Practitioners ("the medical register"). The Medical Act 1983 (amended) notes that, "The main objective of the General Council in exercising their functions is to protect, promote and maintain the health and safety of the public."
 
Secondly, the GMC regulates and sets the standards for medical schools in the UK, and liaises with other nations' medical and university regulatory bodies over medical schools overseas, leading to some qualifications being mutually recognised. Since 2010, it has also regulated postgraduate medical education.

Thirdly, the GMC is responsible for a licensing and revalidation system for all practising doctors in the UK, separate from the registration system, on 3 December 2012.

Activities and powers
Due to the principle of autonomy and law of consent there is no legislative restriction on who can treat patients or provide medical or health-related services. In other words, it is not a criminal offence to provide what would be considered medical assistance or treatment to another person – and not just in an emergency. This is in contrast with the position in respect of animals, where it is a criminal offence under the Veterinary Surgeons Act 1966 for someone who is not a registered veterinary surgeon (or in certain more limited circumstances a registered veterinary nurse) to provide treatment (save in an emergency) to an animal they do not own.

Parliament, since the enactment of the 1858 Act, has conferred on the GMC powers to grant various legal benefits and responsibilities to those medical practitioners who are registered with the GMC - a public body and association, as described, of the Medical Act of 1983, by Mr Justice Burnett in British Medical Association v General Medical Council.
 

Through which, by an Order in the Privy Council, the GMC describes "The main objective of the General Council in exercising their functions is to protect, promote and maintain the health and safety of the public".

The GMC is funded by annual fees required from those wishing to remain registered and fees for examinations. Fees for registration have risen significantly in the last few years: 2007 fees = £290, 2008 fees = £390, 2009 fees = £410, 2010 fees = £420, 2011 fees = £420, with a 50% discount for doctors earning under £32,000.

In 2011, following the Command Paper "Enabling Excellence-Autonomy and Accountability for Healthcare Workers, Social Workers and Social Care Workers", registration fees were reduced by the GMC in accordance with the Government's strategy for reforming and simplifying the system for regulating healthcare workers in the UK and social workers and social care workers in England and requiring that  "[A]t a time of pay restraint in both the public and private sectors, the burden of fees on individual registrants needs to be minimised."

Registering doctors in the UK

Registration with the GMC confers a number of privileges and duties. GMC registration may be either provisional or full. Provisional registration is granted to those who have completed medical school and enter their first year (F1) of medical training; this may be converted into full registration upon satisfactory completion of the first year of postgraduate training. In the past, a third type of registration ("limited registration") was granted to doctors who had graduated outside the UK and who had completed the Professional and Linguistic Assessment Board examination but who were yet to complete a period of work in the UK. Limited registration was abolished on 19 October 2007 and now international medical graduates can apply for provisional or full registration depending on their level of experience – they still have to meet the GMC's requirement for knowledge and skills and for English language.

The GMC administers the Professional and Linguistic Assessment Board test (PLAB), which has to be sat by non-European Union overseas doctors before they may practice medicine in the UK as a registered doctor.

A registered practitioner found to have committed some offences can be removed from ("struck off") the Medical Register.

Licensing and revalidating doctors in the UK

The GMC is now empowered to license and regularly revalidate the practice of doctors in the UK. When the licensing scheme was introduced in 2009, 13,500 (6.1%) of registered doctors chose not to be licensed. Unlicensed but registered doctors are likely to be non-practising lecturers, managers, or practising overseas, or retired. Whereas all registered doctors in the UK were offered a one-off automatic practise licence in November 2009, since December 2012 no licence will be automatically revalidated, but will be subject to a revalidation process every five years. No doctor may now be registered for the first time without also being issued a licence to practice, although a licensed doctor may give up their licence if they choose. No unlicensed but registered doctor in the UK is subject to revalidation. However, unlicensed but registered doctors in the UK are still subject to fitness-to-practice proceedings, and required to follow the GMC's good medical practice guidance.

Setting standards of good medical practice

The GMC sets standards of professional and ethical conduct that doctors in the UK are required to follow. The main guidance that the GMC provides for doctors is called Good Medical Practice. This outlines the standard of professional conduct that the public expects from its doctors and provides principles that underpin the GMC's fitness-to-practise decisions. Originally written in 1995, a revised edition came into force in November 2006, and another with effect from 22 April 2013. The content of Good Medical Practice has been rearranged into four domains of duties. Their most significant change is the replacement of a duty to, "Act without delay if you have good reason to believe that you or a colleague may be putting patients at risk," to a new duty to, "Take prompt action if you think that patient safety, dignity or comfort is being compromised". Alongside the guidance booklet are a range of explanatory guidelines, including a new one about the use of social media. The GMC also provides additional guidance for doctors on specific ethical topics, such as treating patients under the age of 18, end-of-life care, and conflicts of interest.

Medical education

The GMC regulates medical education and training in the United Kingdom. It runs 'quality assurance' programmes for UK medical schools and postgraduate deaneries to ensure that the necessary standards and outcomes are achieved.

In February 2008 the then Secretary of State for Health, Alan Johnson, agreed with recommendations of the Tooke Report which advised that the Postgraduate Medical Education and Training Board should be assimilated into the GMC. Whilst recognising the achievements made by PMETB, Professor John Tooke concluded that regulation needed to be combined into one body; that there should be one organisation that looked after what he called 'the continuum of medical education', from the moment someone chooses a career in medicine until the point that they retire. The merger, which took effect on 1 April 2010, was welcomed by both PMETB and the GMC.

Misconduct and fitness to practise

A registered medical practitioner may be referred to the GMC if there are doubts about their fitness to practise. The GMC is concerned with ensuring that doctors are safe to practise. Its role is not, for example, to fine doctors or to compensate patients following problems (compensation might be addressed through a medical malpractice lawsuit).  The outcomes of hearings are made available on the GMC website.

Historically the handling of concerns had two streams: one regarding health, the other about conduct or ability, but these streams have been merged, into a single fitness-to-practice process. The GMC has powers to issue advice or warnings to doctors, accept undertakings from them, or refer them to a fitness-to-practise panel. The GMC's fitness-to-practise panels can accept undertakings from a doctor, issue warnings, impose conditions on a doctor's practice, suspend a doctor, or remove them from the medical register (when they are said to be 'struck off'). 

It has been repeatedly established that the GMC's fitness of practice disproportionately affects non-white doctors. Black and ethnic minority doctors are complained about more, investigated more frequently, issued the most severe punishment more frequently, and are least represented in all aspects of governance in the GMC.

On the 18th of June 2021 the GMC, for the first time in its history was found guilty of racial discrimination against a non white doctor by a UK court. A ruling from Reading employment tribunal found that the GMC had discriminated against Dr Karim a consultant urologist based on his race by continuing an investigation into him when it did not investigate the same allegation against a white doctor. The tribunal heard Dr Karim was an internationally renowned urologist of mixed black African and European descent who had been a whistle blower in a case about surgeons performing operations without appropriate training. Following the GMC investigation, Dr Karim attended a fitness-to-practice hearing in 2018, after which he was cleared of any wrongdoing. After the hearing, Dr Karim said: "Right from the outset, the GMC saw me as a guilty black doctor and withheld evidence that could have proven my innocence.

Dr Karim described being wrongly accused of bullying was “pretty devastating”. He said: “You feel as though everything has collapsed and is falling apart. When you’ve done nothing, you realise people can be so vindictive. I was discriminated against by the GMC and I had clear-cut evidence that I was innocent but they withheld evidence during my fitness-to-practice tribunal in 2018. It is a landmark victory and the first time it has ever been done against the GMC. They basically look at your name and where you are from and they decide the case beforehand based on that — it is pretty shocking, to be honest. My background was the only difference between me and the guy who was let off and he was my main comparison throughout this whole case. He was white and I have a Muslim name and I’m mixed race. Unfortunately, with the NHS, there is an undercurrent of hidden racism and, sadly, it is rife throughout the system, right up to the regulator".

Emergency Driving

Gaining registration with the GMC (whether provisional or full) also allows the registrant to fit and utilise green flashing lights to their car.  Such lights can be used when attending a medical emergency to alert other road users to their presents and intentions. They can also make a doctors car more visible if they have stopped at an accident scene.  They do not confer exemptions to road traffic legislations.

Reform
Since 2001, the GMC's fitness-to-practise decisions have been subject to review by the Council for Healthcare Regulatory Excellence (CHRE), which may vary sentences.

The GMC is also accountable to the Parliament of the United Kingdom through the Health Select Committee. In its first report on the GMC, the Committee described the GMC as "a high-performing medical regulator", but called for some changes to fitness-to-practice rules and practices, including allowing the GMC the right to appeal sentences of its panels.

In the 2000s, the GMC implemented wide-ranging reforms of its organisation and procedures. In part, such moves followed the Shipman killings. They followed a direction set by the UK government in its white paper, Trust, Assurance and Safety. In 2001, freemasonry was added to the register of interests of council members that the GMC published. One of the key changes was to reduce the size of the Council itself, and changing its composition to an equal number of medical and lay members, rather than the majority being doctors. Legislation passed in December 2002 allowed changes in the composition of the Council from the following year, with the number of members reducing from 104 to 35, increasing the proportion of lay members.

In July 2011, the GMC accepted further changes that would separate its presentation of fitness-to-practise cases from their adjudication, which would become the responsibility of a new body, the Medical Practitioners Tribunal Service. The GMC had previously been criticised for combining these two roles in a single organization.

A forthcoming reform to medical registration is the introduction of revalidation of doctors, more similar to the periodic process common in American states, in which the professional is expected to prove his or her professional development and skills. Revalidation is scheduled to start in 2012.

On 16 February 2011, the Secretary of State for Health, Andrew Lansley, made a Written Ministerial Statement in the Justice section entitled 'Health Care Workers, Social Workers and Social Care Workers' in which he said:

  
Within the Command Paper:- 
Sir Liam Donaldson, a former chief medical officer had recently told the Mid Staffordshire Foundation Trust public inquiry that he had been involved in discussions about the Nursing and Midwifery Council merging with the General Medical Council, but proponents had "backed off" from the idea and the Council for Healthcare Regulatory Excellence was created instead to share best practice. Sir Liam said the CHRE had been "reasonably successful" but it would be "worth looking at the possibility of a merger" between the GMC and NMC.

Criticism

Self-regulation and handling of complaints
Concern has resulted from several studies that suggest that the GMC's handling of complaints appears to differ depending on race or overseas qualifications, but it has been argued that this might be due to indirect factors.
However a ruling on the 18th of June 2021 by a UK court for the first time found the GMC guilty of racial discrimination in its disciplinary procedures.

The mortality and morbidity among doctors going through GMC procedures has attracted attention. In 2003/4 between 4 and 5% of doctors undergoing fitness to practice scrutiny died. In response to a request for information in accordance with the Freedom of Information Act 2000, the GMC revealed that 68 doctors had died recently whilst undergoing a fitness to practice investigation,

In an internal report, "Doctors Who Commit Suicide While Under GMC Fitness to Practise Investigation", the GMC identified 114 doctors, with a median age of 45, who had died during the previous eight years, and had an open and disclosed GMC case at the time of death, and in which 28 had committed suicide and recommended 'emotional resilience' training for doctors.

The Health and Safety Executive's provisional figure for the number of workers fatally injured in 2013/14 was 133, and corresponds to a rate of fatal injury of 0.44 deaths per 100 000 workers. According to the recent Horsfall review, the number of deaths of doctors under GMC procedures in the eight years between 2005 and 2013 accounted for more than 10% of the country's death rate at work of the entire UK workforce, annually and consistently. No other organisation besides the GMC had come anywhere near this occupational fatality rate.

In a warning on "over-regulation" Dr Clare Gerada, a former chair of the Royal College of General Practitioners, commented:

Following the suicide of Professor John E Davies from Guy's Hospital, London, HM Senior Coroner for the area wrote to Niall Dickson with her Regulation 28: Report to Prevent Future Deaths:

Academics at King's College London researched the effects of increased regulatory transparency on the medical profession and found significant unintended consequences.  As doctors reacted anxiously to regulation and media headlines, they practised more defensively.

Charitable status
The GMC was registered as a charity with the Charity Commission of England and Wales on 9 November 2001. The Commissioners having considered the court and the Commission's jurisdiction to consider an organisation's status, which had previously been considered by the courts, in issues of charitable status.

Charities do not normally have to pay income tax or corporation tax, capital gains tax or stamp duty. Following the granting of charitable status the GMC obtained tax relief backdated to 1 April 1994. Charities pay no more than 20% of normal business rates on the buildings they use and occupy. The GMC received confirmation of 80% business rates relief effective from April 1995.
 
 the accounts submitted by the GMC to the Charity Commission showed an income of £97 million, spending of £101m with reserves of £68m.

Shipman inquiry
The GMC was most heavily criticised by Dame Janet Smith as part of her inquiry into the issues arising from the case of Dr Harold Shipman. "Expediency," says Dame Janet, "replaced principle." Dame Janet maintained that the GMC failed to deal properly with Fitness to Practise (FTP) cases, particularly involving established and respected doctors.

In response to the Shipman report, Sir Liam Donaldson, the then Chief Medical Officer, published a report titled Good doctors, safer patients, which appeared in 2006. Donaldson echoed concerns about GMC FTP procedures and other functions of the Council. In his view, complaints were dealt with in a haphazard manner, the GMC caused distress to doctors over trivial complaints while tolerating poor practice in other cases. He accused the Council of being "secretive, tolerant of sub-standard practice and dominated by the professional interest, rather than that of the patient".  Former President of the General Medical Council, Sir Donald Irvine, called for the current Council to be disbanded and re-formed with new members.

Penny Mellor
In July 2010 the GMC was severely criticized in an open letter in the British Medical Journal by Professionals Against Child Abuse for the decision to include Penny Mellor on the GMC's Expert Group on Child Protection. According to the letter, Penny Mellor had been convicted and imprisoned for conspiring to abduct a child, and had led protracted hostile campaigns including false allegations against doctors and other professionals involved in child protection cases. She had also campaigned against Sir Roy Meadow and Professor David Southall, who were erased from the medical register by the GMC but subsequently re-instated after court rulings. Penny Mellor subsequently resigned from the Expert Group.

John Walker-Smith
In March 2012, the High Court of England and Wales overturned a 2010 decision by the GMC to strike pediatric gastroenterologist John Walker-Smith off the medical register for serious professional misconduct. In his ruling, the presiding judge criticized what he said were the GMC's "inadequate and superficial reasoning and, in a number of instances, a wrong conclusion," and stated, "It would be a misfortune if this were to happen again."

Junior doctors contract
Controversy arose in July 2016 when the General Medical Council announced it would be appointing Charlie Massey as its new CEO. Massey had been an adviser to health secretary Jeremy Hunt on the controversial Junior doctors contract, which had led to several days of industrial action by doctors over concerns about feasibility and patient safety. Many doctors felt this reflected a clear conflict of interest and signed a petition to the medical council for transparency in its appointment process. The medical council issued a response claiming that they were still an independent body. Massey had also signally failed to distinguish himself in front of the Public Accounts Committee of Parliament.

Officers
The Council is composed of six medical professionals and six lay members. All members are appointed by the Privy Council. The current Chair is Dame Carrie MacEwen who has served since May 2022. The current chief executive and registrar is Charlie Massey.

Christine Murrell was the first woman elected to the GMC in 1933, however she died before she could take her seat. In 1950, Hilda Lloyd became the first female member of the Council.

Other regulators of healthcare professionals
The Professional Standards Authority for Health and Social Care (PSA), is an independent body accountable to the UK Parliament, with the remit to promote the health and well-being of patients and the public in the regulation of health professionals. But the PSA does not have legal power to investigate complaints about regulators. It advises the four UK government health departments on issues relating to the regulation of health professionals; scrutinising and overseeing the work of the nine regulatory bodies:-

 Health and Care Professions Council (regulates other health professions in the UK)
 Nursing and Midwifery Council (regulates nurses and midwives)
 General Optical Council
 General Dental Council
 General Chiropractic Council
 General Osteopathic Council
 General Pharmaceutical Council
 Pharmaceutical Society of Northern Ireland
 General Medical Council

In response to the Government's recent proposals the Council for Healthcare Regulatory Excellence has made a call for ideas in their December 2011 paper 'Cost effectiveness and efficiency in health professional regulation' for 'right-touch regulation' described as being

References

Further reading 
 MacAlister, D. Introductory Address on the General Medical Council (lecture, 2 October 1906)

External links 
 

1858 establishments in the United Kingdom
Medical and health regulators
Medical regulation in the United Kingdom
Organisations based in the London Borough of Camden
Organizations established in 1858
Professional associations based in the United Kingdom
Regulators of the United Kingdom